Gradella is a village in the province of Cremona in Italy. It is a frazione of the comune of Pandino.

History

The origins of Gradella come back to the Early Middle Ages (probably between the 8th and the 9th centuries), and it had to be a lombard garrison with a castle probably destroyed in the 13th century.

Main sights
 The parish church of the Holy Trinity and Saint Bassian, 19th century

Notable people

 Egidio Miragoli, (born 1955) bishop of Mondovì

References 

Cities and towns in Lombardy
Frazioni of the province of Cremona